The Kerikeri River is a short river of the Waikato region of New Zealand's North Island. It flows into the northern shore of Raglan Harbour.

The valley is largely along the line of the fault on the eastern edge of Whaingaroa Harbour. It flows over Coleman Conglomerate and, at its lower end, blue-grey Puti Siltstone, both of Puaroan age (about 150 million years ago).

From about 1870 Sam and Tom Wilson ran a flax mill powered by a wheel in the river. Much of the native bush was cleared for farming between 1910 and 1920.

See also
List of rivers of New Zealand

References

External links 
 1:50,000 map at NZ Topomaps
 1955 Waingaro Landing aerial photo – the foreground shows part of the Kerikeri River arm of the harbour, which is over 3km long. The Waingaro River joins the estuary in the middle left of the photo.
 2012 Estuarine Vegetation Survey – page 15 describes the wildlife in the Kerikeri River arm of the harbour.

Rivers of Waikato
Waikato District
Rivers of New Zealand